Porphobilinogen (PBG) is an organic compound that occurs in living organisms as an intermediate in the biosynthesis of porphyrins, which include critical substances like hemoglobin and chlorophyll.

The structure of the molecule can be described as molecule of pyrrole with sidechains substituted for hydrogen atoms at positions 2, 3 and 4 in the ring (1 being the nitrogen atom); respectively, an aminomethyl group , an acetic acid (carboxymethyl) group , and a propionic acid (carboxyethyl) group .

Biosynthesis
In the first step of the porphyrin biosynthesis pathway, porphobilinogen is generated from aminolevulinate (ALA) by the enzyme ALA dehydratase.

Metabolism
In the typical porphyrin biosynthesis pathway, four molecules of porphobilinogen are concatenated by carbons 2 and 5 of the pyrrole ring (adjacent to the nitrogen atom) into hydroxymethyl bilane by the enzyme porphobilinogen deaminase, also known as hydroxymethylbilane synthase.

Pathologies
Acute intermittent porphyria causes an increase in urinary porphobilinogen.

References 

Metabolism
Pyrroles
Carboxylic acids
Amines